Captain Zed and the Zee Zone is a  animated television series, produced by Collingwood O’Hare for Scottish Television Film Enterprises in association with DIC Entertainment and Shanghai Morning Sun Animation Co., Ltd. and distributed by HIT Communications PLC. The 26-episode were produced an originally airing on CITV in the United Kingdom.

Premise
When children go to sleep, it's Captain Zed's and his partner PJ's job to prevent children from having nightmares in the dream zone.

Episodes

Season 1 (1991)
 Making the Grade (story: David Ehrman; teleplay: David Ehrman and Tony Collingwood)
 Curtain Call (story: Jocelyn Stevenson; teleplay: Jocelyn Stevenson, Judy Rothman, and Tony Collingwood)
 Finishing School (story: Tony Collingwood; teleplay: Jack Hanrahan and Eleanor Burian-Mohr)
 Revenge of the Killer Bunnies (story: Tony Collingwood; teleplay: Paul Dell and Steven Weiss)
 Nasty Norman (story: Tony Collingwood; teleplay: Tony Collingwood, Paul Dell, and Steven Weiss)
 Follow the Leader (written by Alisa Marie Schudt)
 Monster Factor (written by Tony Collingwood)
 Catnapped (based on a story by Harvinda Sikmon, teleplay by Tony Collingwood)
 Invasion Dreambase (written by Tony Collingwood)
 Growing Pains (written by Phil Harnage and Charles Kaufman)
 Christmas Nightmare (story: Phil Harnage and Tony Collingwood; teleplay: Tony Collingwood, Eleanor Burian-Mohr, Jack Hanrahan, and Judy Rothman)
 Commander, I Shrunk the Dream Patrol (story: Phil Harnage, Paul Dell, and Steven Weiss; teleplay: Paul Dell and Steven Weiss)
 Cries & Dolls (written by Judy Rothman)

Season 2 (1992-1993)
 Look who's Dreaming (written by Tony Collingwood)
 Farewell, My Bully (written by Tony Collingwood)
 The Planet of the Hopeless Liars (written by Tony Collingwood, Steven Weiss, and Paul Dell)
 A Dark Day's Night (written by Tony Collingwood, Jack Hanrahan, and Eleanor Burian-Mohr)
 Send In The Clones (written by Judy Rothman)
 The Curtain Monster Dream Eaters from Another Dimension (written by Tony Collingwood)
 Lost in the Backpack (written by Tony Collingwood, Jack Hanrahan, and Eleanor Burian-Mohr)
 Wedding Bells (written by Jocelyn Stevenson and Tony Collingwood)
 I Want My Zed T.V. (written by Skip Sheppard and Tony Collingwood)
 To Bee Or Not To Bee (story by Selena D’Santos, teleplay by Tony Collingwood)
 Mind Over Mutter (written by Paul Dell, Steven Weiss, and Tony Collingwood)
 Computer Chaos (based on a story by Harvinda Sikmon, teleplay by Tony Collingwood)
 Loch Ness Nightmare (written by Tony Collingwood)

Voices 
 Julian Holloway as Captain Zed
 Jay Brazeau as Snort
 Garry Chalk as Captain Flannel
 Ian James Corlett as Mutter
 Wally Marsh as The Commander
 Pauline Newstone as Doris
 Venus Terzo as P.J.
 Dale Wilson as Larry
 Tomm Wright as Spring

Additional voices 
 Long John Baldry
 Babz Chula
 Michael Donovan
 Christopher Gaze
 Shay Hampton
 Jeremy Jacobson
 Jesse Moss
 Katie Murray
 Margot Pinvidic
 Kirsten R
 Graham Rittenger
 Tony Sampson
 Andrew Seebaran
 Alan Shearman
 Kelly Sheridan
 Chelan Simmons
 Cyrus Thiedeke
 Chris Wilding
 Manny Combo

Broadcasts
In the UK, the series was split in two. The first series had 13 episodes and was first broadcast on 17 October 1991. The second series had 13 episodes and started airing on 15th October 1992. Repeats were shown in 1992 and 1993. The show was re-aired in 1995 on Scottish television and in 2009 on wknd@stv - a children's television strand on Scottish television channel, STV at the time. The series was also broadcast in Gaelic during the 90s.

Although it was produced in the United States and featured voice actors from Canada, this show has never aired in North America, nor has it ever had any official Region 1 home video or DVD releases. 

The series has been screened in numerous countries around the world.

Notes

References

External links 
 
Captain Zed and the Zee Zone at Toonhound.com
 at Collingwood & Co

1991 British television series debuts
1993 British television series endings
1990s British children's television series
British children's animated comedy television series
ITV children's television shows
Television shows produced by Scottish Television
Television series by DIC Entertainment
English-language television shows
Television series by Mattel Creations
1990s British animated television series
1990s American animated television series
1991 American television series debuts
1992 American television series endings
American children's animated comedy television series
1990s animated television series
Television characters introduced in 1991